Jim Bennett is a Canadian author, lawyer and former politician in Newfoundland and Labrador. He was elected as the Member of the House of Assembly for St. Barbe in the 2011 provincial election serving until 2015. In 2006, Bennett was acclaimed leader of the Liberal Party of Newfoundland and Labrador, but resigned from the post after just three months. In 2013, Bennett unsuccessfully ran for the leadership of the provincial Liberal Party in their 2013 election.

Politics
Bennett entered provincial politics in 2006, after he was acclaimed leader of the Liberal Party. Due to internal conflicts with his party Bennett resigned as leader after just three months. He was replaced by former interim leader Gerry Reid. In the 2007 general election he was unsuccessful in his bid to defeat Progressive Conservative incumbent Wallace Young. Bennett was elected to the Daniel's Harbour town council in the  September 2009 municipal elections.

In March 2010, Bennett was hired by the town of St. Anthony to help in a legal case over the moving of air ambulance service to Labrador. He filed an injunction to stop the province from moving the air ambulance services but was unsuccessful.

In 2011, he once again ran in St. Barbe and this time was successful in defeating Young. In March 2012, the governing Progressive Conservatives announced that a month earlier Bennett had left what they considered to be a threatening voice mail at cabinet minister Joan Burke's office. Bennett, who had been seeking help for a constituent, said in the recording that "If this problem is not resolved today, you can expect me to absolutely vilify your minister on Monday morning on Open Line." He went on to say "I will absolutely trash your minister, say what a bunch of idiots she’s got working in her department. Fix the problem and fix it today, or there will be lots of trouble." Bennett apologized in the House of Assembly for the message.

In 2013, Bennett unsuccessfully ran for the leadership of the provincial Liberal Party in their 2013 election.

Bennett's district of St. Barbe was abolished in the 2015 redrawing of districts, he unsuccessfully ran for the Liberal nomination in the district of Lewisporte-Twillingate. Following his nomination lost he subsequently retired following the 2015 election.

Personal life
Bennett is a lawyer, and is married to Sandra Pupatello, a former member of the Legislative Assembly of Ontario and Minister of Economic Development and Trade in the Ontario Liberal Party government of Dalton McGuinty.

Bennett is based in the western Newfoundland coast community of Daniel's Harbour after living a number of years in Windsor, Ontario. While living in Windsor, Bennett twice unsuccessfully sought election to Windsor's city council.

Electoral history

|-

|-

|-

|NDP
|Diane Ryan
|align="right"|437
|align="right"|10.84%
|align="right"|
|}

|-

|-

|-

|NDP
|Gary B. Noel
|align="right"|196
|align="right"|4.62%
|align="right"|
|}

References

External links
 Liberal Party of Newfoundland and Labrador

Year of birth missing (living people)
Newfoundland and Labrador political party leaders
Living people
Liberal Party of Newfoundland and Labrador MHAs
21st-century Canadian politicians
Newfoundland and Labrador municipal councillors